{{Speciesbox
| image = 
| image_caption = 
| taxon = Hemiaclis ventrosa
| authority = Friele, 1874
| synonyms_ref = 
| synonyms = 
 Aclis ventrosa  Friele, 1874 
 Hemiaclis glabra  G.O. Sars, 1878 
 Hemiaclis ventrosus  Friele, 1874 
}}Hemiaclis ventrosa'' is a species of sea snail, a marine gastropod mollusk in the family Eulimidae.

Distribution
This species occurs in the following locations:

 European waters (ERMS scope)
 United Kingdom Exclusive Economic Zone

Description 
The maximum recorded shell length is 4 mm.

Habitat 
Minimum recorded depth is 1900 m. Maximum recorded depth is 1900 m.

References

External links

Eulimidae
Gastropods described in 1874